Rome (Italian and Latin: Roma ) is the capital city of Italy. It is also the capital of the Lazio region, the centre of the Metropolitan City of Rome, and a special comune named Comune di Roma Capitale. The Metropolitan City of Rome, with a population of 4,355,725 residents, is the most populous metropolitan city in Italy. Its metropolitan area is the third-most populous within Italy. Rome is located in the central-western portion of the Italian Peninsula, within Lazio (Latium), along the shores of the Tiber. Vatican City (the smallest country in the world) is an independent country inside the city boundaries of Rome, the only existing example of a country within a city. Rome is often referred to as the City of Seven Hills due to its geographic location, and also as the "Eternal City". Rome is generally considered to be the "cradle of Western civilization and Christian culture", and the centre of the Catholic Church.

Rome's history spans 28 centuries. While Roman mythology dates the founding of Rome at around 753 BC, the site has been inhabited for much longer, making it a major human settlement for almost three millennia and one of the oldest continuously occupied cities in Europe. The city's early population originated from a mix of Latins, Etruscans, and Sabines. Eventually, the city successively became the capital of the Roman Kingdom, the Roman Republic and the Roman Empire, and is regarded by many as the first-ever Imperial city and metropolis. It was first called The Eternal City by the Roman poet Tibullus in the 1st century BC, and the expression was also taken up by Ovid, Virgil, and Livy. Rome is also called "Caput Mundi" (Capital of the World). After the fall of the Empire in the west, which marked the beginning of the Middle Ages, Rome slowly fell under the political control of the Papacy, and in the 8th century, it became the capital of the Papal States, which lasted until 1870. Beginning with the Renaissance, almost all popes since Nicholas V (1447–1455) pursued a coherent architectural and urban programme over four hundred years, aimed at making the city the artistic and cultural centre of the world. In this way, Rome became first one of the major centres of the Renaissance and then the birthplace of both the Baroque style and Neoclassicism. Famous artists, painters, sculptors, and architects made Rome the centre of their activity, creating masterpieces throughout the city. In 1871, Rome became the capital of the Kingdom of Italy, which, in 1946, became the Italian Republic.

In 2019, Rome was the 14th most visited city in the world, with 8.6 million tourists, the third most visited city in the European Union, and the most popular tourist destination in Italy. Its historic centre is listed by UNESCO as a World Heritage Site. The host city for the 1960 Summer Olympics, Rome is also the seat of several specialised agencies of the United Nations, such as the Food and Agriculture Organization (FAO), the World Food Programme (WFP) and the International Fund for Agricultural Development (IFAD). The city also hosts the Secretariat of the Parliamentary Assembly of the Union for the Mediterranean (UfM) as well as the headquarters of many international businesses, such as Eni, Enel, TIM, Leonardo, and banks such as BNL. Numerous companies are based within Rome's EUR business district, such as the luxury fashion house Fendi located in the Palazzo della Civiltà Italiana. The presence of renowned international brands in the city has made Rome an important centre of fashion and design, and the Cinecittà Studios have been the set of many Academy Award–winning movies.

Etymology

According to the Ancient Romans' founding myth, the name Roma came from the city's founder and first king, Romulus.

However, it is possible that the name Romulus was actually derived from Rome itself. As early as the 4th century, there have been alternative theories proposed on the origin of the name Roma. Several hypotheses have been advanced focusing on its linguistic roots which however remain uncertain:
 From Rumon or Rumen, archaic name of the Tiber, which in turn is supposedly related to the Greek verb ῥέω (rhéō) 'to flow, stream' and the Latin verb ruō 'to hurry, rush';
 From the Etruscan word 𐌓𐌖𐌌𐌀 (ruma), whose root is *rum- "teat", with possible reference either to the totem wolf that adopted and suckled the cognately named twins Romulus and Remus, or to the shape of the Palatine and Aventine Hills;
 From the Greek word ῥώμη (rhṓmē), which means strength.

History

Earliest history

While there have been discoveries of archaeological evidence of human occupation of the Rome area from approximately 14,000 years ago, the dense layer of much younger debris obscures Palaeolithic and Neolithic sites. Evidence of stone tools, pottery, and stone weapons attest to about 10,000 years of human presence. Several excavations support the view that Rome grew from pastoral settlements on the Palatine Hill built above the area of the future Roman Forum. Between the end of the Bronze Age and the beginning of the Iron Age, each hill between the sea and the Capitol was topped by a village (on the Capitol Hill, a village is attested since the end of the 14th century BC). However, none of them yet had an urban quality. Nowadays, there is a wide consensus that the city developed gradually through the aggregation ("synoecism") of several villages around the largest one, placed above the Palatine. This aggregation was facilitated by the increase of agricultural productivity above the subsistence level, which also allowed the establishment of secondary and tertiary activities. These, in turn, boosted the development of trade with the Greek colonies of southern Italy (mainly Ischia and Cumae). These developments, which according to archaeological evidence took place during the mid-eighth century BC, can be considered as the "birth" of the city. Despite recent excavations at the Palatine hill, the view that Rome was founded deliberately in the middle of the eighth century BC, as the legend of Romulus suggests, remains a fringe hypothesis.

Legend of the founding of Rome

Traditional stories handed down by the ancient Romans themselves explain the earliest history of their city in terms of legend and myth. The most familiar of these myths, and perhaps the most famous of all Roman myths, is the story of Romulus and Remus, the twins who were suckled by a she-wolf. They decided to build a city, but after an argument, Romulus killed his brother and the city took his name. According to the Roman annalists, this happened on 21 April 753 BC. This legend had to be reconciled with a dual tradition, set earlier in time, that had the Trojan refugee Aeneas escape to Italy and found the line of Romans through his son Iulus, the namesake of the Julio-Claudian dynasty.
This was accomplished by the Roman poet Virgil in the first century BC. In addition, Strabo mentions an older story, that the city was an Arcadian colony founded by Evander. Strabo also writes that Lucius Coelius Antipater believed that Rome was founded by Greeks.

Monarchy and republic

After the foundation by Romulus according to a legend, Rome was ruled for a period of 244 years by a monarchical system, initially with sovereigns of Latin and Sabine origin, later by Etruscan kings. The tradition handed down seven kings: Romulus, Numa Pompilius, Tullus Hostilius, Ancus Marcius, Tarquinius Priscus, Servius Tullius and Lucius Tarquinius Superbus.

In 509 BC, the Romans expelled the last king from their city and established an oligarchic republic. Rome then began a period characterised by internal struggles between patricians (aristocrats) and plebeians (small landowners), and by constant warfare against the populations of central Italy: Etruscans, Latins, Volsci, Aequi, and Marsi. After becoming master of Latium, Rome led several wars (against the Gauls, Osci-Samnites and the Greek colony of Taranto, allied with Pyrrhus, king of Epirus) whose result was the conquest of the Italian peninsula, from the central area up to Magna Graecia.

The third and second century BC saw the establishment of Roman hegemony over the Mediterranean and the Balkans, through the three Punic Wars (264–146 BC) fought against the city of Carthage and the three Macedonian Wars (212–168 BC) against Macedonia. The first Roman provinces were established at this time: Sicily, Sardinia and Corsica, Hispania, Macedonia, Achaea and Africa.

From the beginning of the 2nd century BC, power was contested between two groups of aristocrats: the optimates, representing the conservative part of the Senate, and the populares, which relied on the help of the plebs (urban lower class) to gain power. In the same period, the bankruptcy of the small farmers and the establishment of large slave estates caused large-scale migration to the city. The continuous warfare led to the establishment of a professional army, which turned out to be more loyal to its generals than to the republic. Because of this, in the second half of the second century and during the first century BC there were conflicts both abroad and internally: after the failed attempt of social reform of the populares Tiberius and Gaius Gracchus, and the war against Jugurtha, there was a civil war from which the general Sulla emerged victorious. A major slave revolt under Spartacus followed, and then the establishment of the first Triumvirate with Caesar, Pompey and Crassus.

The conquest of Gaul made Caesar immensely powerful and popular, which led to a second civil war against the Senate and Pompey. After his victory, Caesar established himself as dictator for life. His assassination led to a second Triumvirate among Octavian (Caesar's grandnephew and heir), Mark Antony and Lepidus, and to another civil war between Octavian and Antony.

Empire
In 27 BC, Octavian became princeps civitatis and took the title of Augustus, founding the principate, a diarchy between the princeps and the senate. During the reign of Nero, two thirds of the city was ruined after the Great Fire of Rome, and the persecution of Christians commenced. Rome was established as a de facto empire, which reached its greatest expansion in the second century under the Emperor Trajan. Rome was confirmed as caput Mundi, i.e. the capital of the known world, an expression which had already been used in the Republican period. During its first two centuries, the empire was ruled by emperors of the Julio-Claudian, Flavian (who also built an eponymous amphitheatre, known as the Colosseum), and Antonine dynasties. This time was also characterised by the spread of the Christian religion, preached by Jesus Christ in Judea in the first half of the first century (under Tiberius) and popularised by his apostles through the empire and beyond. The Antonine age is considered the zenith of the Empire, whose territory ranged from the Atlantic Ocean to the Euphrates and from Britain to Egypt.

After the end of the Severan Dynasty in 235, the Empire entered into a 50-year period known as the Crisis of the Third Century during which there were numerous putsches by generals, who sought to secure the region of the empire they were entrusted with due to the weakness of central authority in Rome. There was the so-called Gallic Empire from 260 to 274 and the revolts of Zenobia and her father from the mid-260s which sought to fend off Persian incursions. Some regions – Britain, Spain, and North Africa – were hardly affected. Instability caused economic deterioration, and there was a rapid rise in inflation as the government debased the currency in order to meet expenses. The Germanic tribes along the Rhine and north of the Balkans made serious, uncoordinated incursions from the 250s–280s that were more like giant raiding parties rather than attempts to settle. The Persian Empire invaded from the east several times during the 230s to 260s but were eventually defeated. Emperor Diocletian (284) undertook the restoration of the State. He ended the Principate and introduced the Tetrarchy which sought to increase state power. The most marked feature was the unprecedented intervention of the State down to the city level: whereas the State had submitted a tax demand to a city and allowed it to allocate the charges, from his reign the State did this down to the village level. In a vain attempt to control inflation, he imposed price controls which did not last. He or Constantine regionalised the administration of the empire which fundamentally changed the way it was governed by creating regional dioceses (the consensus seems to have shifted from 297 to 313/14 as the date of creation due to the argument of Constantin Zuckerman in 2002 "Sur la liste de Verone et la province de grande armenie, Melanges Gilber Dagron). The existence of regional fiscal units from 286 served as the model for this unprecedented innovation. The emperor quickened the process of removing military command from governors. Henceforth, civilian administration and military command would be separate. He gave governors more fiscal duties and placed them in charge of the army logistical support system as an attempt to control it by removing the support system from its control. Diocletian ruled the eastern half, residing in Nicomedia. In 296, he elevated Maximian to Augustus of the western half, where he ruled mostly from Mediolanum when not on the move. In 292, he created two 'junior' emperors, the Caesars, one for each Augustus, Constantius for Britain, Gaul, and Spain whose seat of power was in Trier and Galerius in Sirmium in the Balkans. The appointment of a Caesar was not unknown: Diocletian tried to turn into a system of non-dynastic succession. Upon abdication in 305, the Caesars succeeded and they, in turn, appointed two colleagues for themselves.

After the abdication of Diocletian and Maximian in 305 and a series of civil wars between rival claimants to imperial power, during the years 306–313, the Tetrarchy was abandoned. Constantine the Great undertook a major reform of the bureaucracy, not by changing the structure but by rationalising the competencies of the several ministries during the years 325–330, after he defeated Licinius, emperor in the East, at the end of 324. The so-called Edict of Milan of 313, actually a fragment of a letter from Licinius to the governors of the eastern provinces, granted freedom of worship to everyone, including Christians, and ordered the restoration of confiscated church properties upon petition to the newly created vicars of dioceses. He funded the building of several churches and allowed clergy to act as arbitrators in civil suits (a measure that did not outlast him but which was restored in part much later). He transformed the town of Byzantium into his new residence, which, however, was not officially anything more than an imperial residence like Milan or Trier or Nicomedia until given a city prefect in May 359 by Constantius II; Constantinople.

Christianity in the form of the Nicene Creed became the official religion of the empire in 380, via the Edict of Thessalonica issued in the name of three emperors – Gratian, Valentinian II, and Theodosius I – with Theodosius clearly the driving force behind it. He was the last emperor of a unified empire: after his death in 395, his sons, Arcadius and Honorius divided the empire into a western and an eastern part. The seat of government in the Western Roman Empire was transferred to Ravenna in 408, but from 450 the emperors mostly resided in the capital city, Rome.

Rome, which had lost its central role in the administration of the empire, was sacked in 410 by the Visigoths led by Alaric I, but very little physical damage was done, most of which was repaired. What could not be so easily replaced were portable items such as artwork in precious metals and items for domestic use (loot). The popes embellished the city with large basilicas, such as Santa Maria Maggiore (with the collaboration of the emperors). The population of the city had fallen from 800,000 to 450–500,000 by the time the city was sacked in 455 by Genseric, king of the Vandals. The weak emperors of the fifth century could not stop the decay, leading to the deposition of Romulus Augustus on 22 August 476, which marked the end of the Western Roman Empire and, for many historians, the beginning of the Middle Ages. The decline of the city's population was caused by the loss of grain shipments from North Africa, from 440 onward, and the unwillingness of the senatorial class to maintain donations to support a population that was too large for the resources available. Even so, strenuous efforts were made to maintain the monumental centre, the palatine, and the largest baths, which continued to function until the Gothic siege of 537. The large baths of Constantine on the Quirinale were even repaired in 443, and the extent of the damage exaggerated and dramatised. However, the city gave an appearance overall of shabbiness and decay because of the large abandoned areas due to population decline. The population declined to 500,000 by 452 and 100,000 by 500 AD (perhaps larger, though no certain figure can be known). After the Gothic siege of 537, the population dropped to 30,000 but had risen to 90,000 by the papacy of Gregory the Great. The population decline coincided with the general collapse of urban life in the West in the fifth and sixth centuries, with few exceptions. Subsidized state grain distributions to the poorer members of society continued right through the sixth century and probably prevented the population from falling further. The figure of 450,000–500,000 is based on the amount of pork, 3,629,000 lbs. distributed to poorer Romans during five winter months at the rate of five Roman lbs per person per month, enough for 145,000 persons or 1/4 or 1/3 of the total population. Grain distribution to 80,000 ticket holders at the same time suggests 400,000 (Augustus set the number at 200,000 or one-fifth of the population).

Middle Ages

After the fall of the Western Roman Empire in 476 AD, Rome was first under the control of Odoacer and then became part of the Ostrogothic Kingdom before returning to East Roman control after the Gothic War, which devastated the city in 546 and 550. Its population declined from more than a million in 210 AD to 500,000 in 273 to 35,000 after the Gothic War (535–554), reducing the sprawling city to groups of inhabited buildings interspersed among large areas of ruins, vegetation, vineyards and market gardens. It is generally thought the population of the city until 300 AD was 1 million (estimates range from 2 million to 750,000) declining to 750–800,000 in 400 AD, 450–500,000 in 450 AD and down to 80–100,000 in 500 AD (though it may have been twice this).

The Bishop of Rome, called the Pope, was important since the early days of Christianity because of the martyrdom of both the apostles Peter and Paul there. The Bishops of Rome were also seen (and still are seen by Catholics) as the successors of Peter, who is considered the first Bishop of Rome. The city thus became of increasing importance as the centre of the Catholic Church.

After the Lombard invasion of Italy (569–572), the city remained nominally Byzantine, but in reality, the popes pursued a policy of equilibrium between the Byzantines, the Franks, and the Lombards. In 729, the Lombard king Liutprand donated the north Latium town of Sutri to the Church, starting its temporal power. In 756, Pepin the Short, after having defeated the Lombards, gave the Pope temporal jurisdiction over the Roman Duchy and the Exarchate of Ravenna, thus creating the Papal States. Since this period, three powers tried to rule the city: the pope, the nobility (together with the chiefs of militias, the judges, the Senate and the populace), and the Frankish king, as king of the Lombards, patricius, and Emperor. These three parties (theocratic, republican, and imperial) were a characteristic of Roman life during the entire Middle Ages. On Christmas night of 800, Charlemagne was crowned in Rome as emperor of the Holy Roman Empire by Pope Leo III: on that occasion, the city hosted for the first time the two powers whose struggle for control was to be a constant of the Middle Ages.

In 846, Muslim Arabs unsuccessfully stormed the city's walls, but managed to loot St. Peter's and St. Paul's basilica, both outside the city wall. After the decay of Carolingian power, Rome fell prey to feudal chaos: several noble families fought against the pope, the emperor, and each other. These were the times of Theodora and her daughter Marozia, concubines and mothers of several popes, and of Crescentius, a powerful feudal lord, who fought against the Emperors Otto II and Otto III. The scandals of this period forced the papacy to reform itself: the election of the pope was reserved to the cardinals, and reform of the clergy was attempted. The driving force behind this renewal was the monk Ildebrando da Soana, who once elected pope under the name of Gregory VII became involved into the Investiture Controversy against Emperor Henry IV. Subsequently, Rome was sacked and burned by the Normans under Robert Guiscard who had entered the city in support of the Pope, then besieged in Castel Sant'Angelo.

During this period, the city was autonomously ruled by a senatore or patrizio. In the 12th century, this administration, like other European cities, evolved into the commune, a new form of social organisation controlled by the new wealthy classes. Pope Lucius II fought against the Roman commune, and the struggle was continued by his successor Pope Eugenius III: by this stage, the commune, allied with the aristocracy, was supported by Arnaldo da Brescia, a monk who was a religious and social reformer. After the pope's death, Arnaldo was taken prisoner by Adrianus IV, which marked the end of the commune's autonomy. Under Pope Innocent III, whose reign marked the apogee of the papacy, the commune liquidated the senate, and replaced it with a Senatore, who was subject to the pope.

In this period, the papacy played a role of secular importance in Western Europe, often acting as arbitrators between Christian monarchs and exercising additional political powers.

In 1266, Charles of Anjou, who was heading south to fight the Hohenstaufen on behalf of the pope, was appointed Senator. Charles founded the Sapienza, the university of Rome. In that period the pope died, and the cardinals, summoned in Viterbo, could not agree on his successor. This angered the people of the city, who then unroofed the building where they met and imprisoned them until they had nominated the new pope; this marked the birth of the conclave. In this period the city was also shattered by continuous fights between the aristocratic families: Annibaldi, Caetani, Colonna, Orsini, Conti, nested in their fortresses built above ancient Roman edifices, fought each other to control the papacy.

Pope Boniface VIII, born Caetani, was the last pope to fight for the church's universal domain; he proclaimed a crusade against the Colonna family and, in 1300, called for the first Jubilee of Christianity, which brought millions of pilgrims to Rome. However, his hopes were crushed by the French king Philip the Fair, who took him prisoner and killed him in Anagni. Afterwards, a new pope faithful to the French was elected, and the papacy was briefly relocated to Avignon (1309–1377). During this period Rome was neglected, until a plebeian man, Cola di Rienzo, came to power. An idealist and a lover of ancient Rome, Cola dreamed about a rebirth of the Roman Empire: after assuming power with the title of Tribuno, his reforms were rejected by the populace. Forced to flee, Cola returned as part of the entourage of Cardinal Albornoz, who was charged with restoring the Church's power in Italy. Back in power for a short time, Cola was soon lynched by the populace, and Albornoz took possession of the city. In 1377, Rome became the seat of the papacy again under Gregory XI. The return of the pope to Rome in that year unleashed the Western Schism (1377–1418), and for the next forty years, the city was affected by the divisions which rocked the Church.

Early modern history

In 1418, the Council of Constance settled the Western Schism, and a Roman pope, Martin V, was elected. This brought to Rome a century of internal peace, which marked the beginning of the Renaissance. The ruling popes until the first half of the 16th century, from Nicholas V, founder of the Vatican Library, to Pius II, humanist and literate, from Sixtus IV, a warrior pope, to Alexander VI, immoral and nepotist, from Julius II, soldier and patron, to Leo X, who gave his name to this period ("the century of Leo X"), all devoted their energy to the greatness and the beauty of the Eternal City and to the patronage of the arts.

During those years, the centre of the Italian Renaissance moved to Rome from Florence. Majestic works, as the new Saint Peter's Basilica, the Sistine Chapel and Ponte Sisto (the first bridge to be built across the Tiber since antiquity, although on Roman foundations) were created. To accomplish that, the Popes engaged the best artists of the time, including Michelangelo, Perugino, Raphael, Ghirlandaio, Luca Signorelli, Botticelli, and Cosimo Rosselli.

The period was also infamous for papal corruption, with many Popes fathering children, and engaging in nepotism and simony. The corruption of the Popes and the huge expenses for their building projects led, in part, to the Reformation and, in turn, the Counter-Reformation. Under extravagant and rich popes, Rome was transformed into a centre of art, poetry, music, literature, education and culture. Rome became able to compete with other major European cities of the time in terms of wealth, grandeur, the arts, learning and architecture.

The Renaissance period changed the face of Rome dramatically, with works like the Pietà by Michelangelo and the frescoes of the Borgia Apartments. Rome reached the highest point of splendour under Pope Julius II (1503–1513) and his successors Leo X and Clement VII, both members of the Medici family.

In this twenty-year period, Rome became one of the greatest centres of art in the world. The old St. Peter's Basilica built by Emperor Constantine the Great (which by then was in a dilapidated state) was demolished and a new one begun. The city hosted artists like Ghirlandaio, Perugino, Botticelli and Bramante, who built the temple of San Pietro in Montorio and planned a great project to renovate the Vatican. Raphael, who in Rome became one of the most famous painters of Italy, created frescoes in the Villa Farnesina, the Raphael's Rooms, plus many other famous paintings. Michelangelo started the decoration of the ceiling of the Sistine Chapel and executed the famous statue of the Moses for the tomb of Julius II.

Its economy was rich, with the presence of several Tuscan bankers, including Agostino Chigi, who was a friend of Raphael and a patron of arts. Before his early death, Raphael also promoted for the first time the preservation of the ancient ruins. The War of the League of Cognac caused the first plunder of the city in more than five hundred years since the previous sack; in 1527, the Landsknechts of Emperor Charles V sacked the city, bringing an abrupt end to the golden age of the Renaissance in Rome.

Beginning with the Council of Trent in 1545, the Church began the Counter-Reformation in response to the Reformation, a large-scale questioning of the Church's authority on spiritual matters and governmental affairs. This loss of confidence led to major shifts of power away from the Church. Under the popes from Pius IV to Sixtus V, Rome became the centre of a reformed Catholicism and saw the building of new monuments which celebrated the papacy. The popes and cardinals of the 17th and early 18th centuries continued the movement by having the city's landscape enriched with baroque buildings.

This was another nepotistic age; the new aristocratic families (Barberini, Pamphili, Chigi, Rospigliosi, Altieri, Odescalchi) were protected by their respective popes, who built huge baroque buildings for their relatives. During the Age of Enlightenment, new ideas reached the Eternal City, where the papacy supported archaeological studies and improved the people's welfare. But not everything went well for the Church during the Counter-Reformation. There were setbacks in the attempts to assert the Church's power, a notable example being in 1773 when Pope Clement XIV was forced by secular powers to have the Jesuit order suppressed.

Late modern and contemporary
The rule of the Popes was interrupted by the short-lived Roman Republic (1798–1800), which was established under the influence of the French Revolution. The Papal States were restored in June 1800, but during Napoleon's reign Rome was annexed as a Département of the French Empire: first as Département du Tibre (1808–1810) and then as Département Rome (1810–1814). After the fall of Napoleon, the Papal States were reconstituted by a decision of the Congress of Vienna of 1814.

In 1849, a second Roman Republic was proclaimed during a year of revolutions in 1848. Two of the most influential figures of the Italian unification, Giuseppe Mazzini and Giuseppe Garibaldi, fought for the short-lived republic.

Rome then became the focus of hopes of Italian reunification after the rest of Italy was united as the Kingdom of Italy in 1861 with the temporary capital in Florence. That year Rome was declared the capital of Italy even though it was still under the Pope's control. During the 1860s, the last vestiges of the Papal States were under French protection thanks to the foreign policy of Napoleon III. French troops were stationed in the region under Papal control. In 1870 the French troops were withdrawn due to the outbreak of the Franco-Prussian War. Italian troops were able to capture Rome entering the city through a breach near Porta Pia. Pope Pius IX declared himself a prisoner in the Vatican. In 1871 the capital of Italy was moved from Florence to Rome. In 1870 the population of the city was 212,000, all of whom lived with the area circumscribed by the ancient city, and in 1920, the population was 660,000. A significant portion lived outside the walls in the north and across the Tiber in the Vatican area.

Soon after World War I in late 1922 Rome witnessed the rise of Italian Fascism led by Benito Mussolini, who led a march on the city. He did away with democracy by 1926, eventually declaring a new Italian Empire and allying Italy with Nazi Germany in 1938. Mussolini demolished fairly large parts of the city centre in order to build wide avenues and squares which were supposed to celebrate the fascist regime and the resurgence and glorification of classical Rome. The interwar period saw a rapid growth in the city's population which surpassed one million inhabitants soon after 1930. During World War II, due to the art treasuries and the presence of the Vatican, Rome largely escaped the tragic destiny of other European cities. However, on 19 July 1943, the San Lorenzo district was subject to Allied bombing raids, resulting in about 3,000 fatalities and 11,000 injuries, of whom another 1,500 died. Mussolini was arrested on 25 July 1943. On the date of the Italian Armistice 8 September 1943 the city was occupied by the Germans. The Pope declared Rome an open city. It was liberated on 4 June 1944.

Rome developed greatly after the war as part of the "Italian economic miracle" of post-war reconstruction and modernisation in the 1950s and early 1960s. During this period, the years of la dolce vita ("the sweet life"), Rome became a fashionable city, with popular classic films such as Ben Hur, Quo Vadis, Roman Holiday and La Dolce Vita filmed in the city's iconic Cinecittà Studios. The rising trend in population growth continued until the mid-1980s when the comune had more than 2.8 million residents. After this, the population declined slowly as people began to move to nearby suburbs.

Government

Local government
Rome constitutes a comune speciale, named "Roma Capitale", and is the largest both in terms of land area and population among the 8,101 comuni of Italy. It is governed by a mayor and a city council. The seat of the comune is the Palazzo Senatorio on the Capitoline Hill, the historic seat of the city government. The local administration in Rome is commonly referred to as "Campidoglio", the Italian name of the hill.

Administrative and historical subdivisions

Since 1972, the city has been divided into administrative areas, called municipi (sing. municipio) (until 2001 named circoscrizioni). They were created for administrative reasons to increase decentralisation in the city. Each municipio is governed by a president and a council of twenty-five members who are elected by its residents every five years. The municipi frequently cross the boundaries of the traditional, non-administrative divisions of the city. The municipi were originally 20, then 19, and in 2013, their number was reduced to 15.

Rome is also divided into differing types of non-administrative units. The historic centre is divided into 22 rioni, all of which are located within the Aurelian Walls except Prati and Borgo. These originate from the 14 regions of Augustan Rome, which evolved in the Middle Ages into the medieval rioni. In the Renaissance, under Pope Sixtus V, they again reached fourteen, and their boundaries were finally defined under Pope Benedict XIV in 1743.

A new subdivision of the city under Napoleon was ephemeral, and there were no serious changes in the organisation of the city until 1870 when Rome became the third capital of Italy. The needs of the new capital led to an explosion both in the urbanisation and in the population within and outside the Aurelian walls. In 1874, a fifteenth rione, Esquilino, was created on the newly urbanised zone of Monti. At the beginning of the 20th century other rioni were created (the last one was Prati – the only one outside the Walls of Pope Urban VIII – in 1921). Afterwards, for the new administrative subdivisions of the city, the term "quartiere" was used. Today all the rioni are part of the first Municipio, which therefore coincides completely with the historical city (Centro Storico).

Metropolitan and regional government
Rome is the principal town of the Metropolitan City of Rome, operative since 1 January 2015. The Metropolitan City replaced the old provincia di Roma, which included the city's metropolitan area and extends further north until Civitavecchia. The Metropolitan City of Rome is the largest by area in Italy. At , its dimensions are comparable to the region of Liguria. Moreover, the city is also the capital of the Lazio region.

National government

Rome is the national capital of Italy and is the seat of the Italian Government. The official residences of the President of the Italian Republic and the Italian Prime Minister, the seats of both houses of the Italian Parliament and that of the Italian Constitutional Court are located in the historic centre. The state ministries are spread out around the city; these include the Ministry of Foreign Affairs, which is located in Palazzo della Farnesina near the Olympic stadium.

Geography

Location
Rome is in the Lazio region of central Italy on the Tiber river. The original settlement developed on hills that faced onto a ford beside the Tiber Island, the only natural ford of the river in this area. The Rome of the Kings was built on seven hills: the Aventine Hill, the Caelian Hill, the Capitoline Hill, the Esquiline Hill, the Palatine Hill, the Quirinal Hill, and the Viminal Hill. Modern Rome is also crossed by another river, the Aniene, which flows into the Tiber north of the historic centre.

Topography

Throughout the history of Rome, the urban limits of the city were considered to be the area within the city's walls. Originally, these consisted of the Servian Wall, which was built twelve years after the Gaulish sack of the city in 390 BC. This contained most of the Esquiline and Caelian hills, as well as the whole of the other five. Rome outgrew the Servian Wall, but no more walls were constructed until almost 700 years later, when, in 270 AD, Emperor Aurelian began building the Aurelian Walls. Although when the ring was completed most parts of the inhabited area lay inside it (one of the few exceptions was the former village of Ostia, which lies along the Tyrrhenian coast), in the meantime quarters have been built which extend up to  beyond it.

The comune covers an area roughly three times the total area within the Raccordo and is comparable in area to the entire metropolitan cities of Milan and Naples, and to an area six times the size of the territory of these cities. It also includes considerable areas of abandoned marshland which is suitable neither for agriculture nor for urban development.

As a consequence, the density of the comune is not that high, its territory being divided between highly urbanised areas and areas designated as parks, nature reserves, and for agricultural use.

Climate

Rome has a Mediterranean climate (Köppen climate classification: Csa), with hot, dry summers and mild, humid winters.

Snowfall is rare but not unheard of, with light snow or flurries occurring on some winters, generally without accumulation, and major snowfalls on a very rare occurrence (the most recent ones were in 2018, 2012 and 1986).

The average relative humidity is 75%, varying from 72% in July to 77% in November.

Demographics

In 550 BC, Rome was the second largest city in Italy, with Tarentum being the largest. Other sources suggest the population was just under 100,000 from 600 to 500 BC. When the Republic was founded in 509 BC the census recorded a population of 130,000. The republic included the city itself and the immediate surroundings. Other sources suggest a population of 150,000 in 500 BC. It surpassed 300,000 in 150 BC.

The size of the city at the time of the Emperor Augustus is a matter of speculation, with estimates based on grain distribution, grain imports, aqueduct capacity, city limits, population density, census reports, and assumptions about the number of unreported women, children and slaves providing a very wide range. Glenn Storey estimates 450,000 people, Whitney Oates estimates 1.2 million, Neville Morely provides a rough estimate of 800,000 and excludes earlier suggestions of 2 million. Estimates of the city's population towards and after the end of the Roman empire also vary. A.H.M. Jones estimated the population at 650,000 in the mid-fifth century. The damage caused by the sackings may have been overestimated. The population had already started to decline from the late fourth century onward, although around the middle of the fifth century it seems that Rome continued to be the most populous city of the two parts of the Empire. According to Krautheimer it was still close to 800,000 in 400 AD; had declined to 500,000 by 452, and dwindled to perhaps 100,000 in 500 AD. After the Gothic Wars, 535–552, the population may have dwindled temporarily to 30,000. During the pontificate of Pope Gregory I (590–604), it may have reached 90,000, augmented by refugees. Lancon estimates 500,000 based on the number of 'incisi' enrolled as eligible to receive bread, oil and wine rations; the number fell to 120,000 in the reform of 419. Neil Christie, citing free rations for the poorest, estimated 500,000 in the mid-fifth century and still a quarter of a million at the end of the century. Novel 36 of Emperor Valentinian III records 3.629 million pounds of pork to be distributed to the needy at 5 lbs. per month for the five winter months, sufficient for 145,000 recipients. This has been used to suggest a population of just under 500,000. Supplies of grain remained steady until the seizure of the remaining provinces of North Africa in 439 by the Vandals, and may have continued to some degree afterwards for a while. The city's population declined to less than 50,000 people in the Early Middle Ages from 700 AD onward. It continued to stagnate or shrink until the Renaissance.

When the Kingdom of Italy annexed Rome in 1870, the city had a population of about 225,000. Less than half the city within the walls was built up in 1881 when the population recorded was 275,000. This increased to 600,000 by the eve of World War I. The Fascist regime of Mussolini tried to block an excessive demographic rise of the city but failed to prevent it from reaching one million people by the early 1930s. Population growth continued after the Second World War, helped by a post-war economic boom. A construction boom also created many suburbs during the 1950s and 1960s.

In mid-2010, there were 2,754,440 residents in the city proper, while some 4.2 million people lived in the greater Rome area (which can be approximately identified with its administrative metropolitan city, with a population density of about 800 inhabitants/km2 stretching over more than ). Minors (children ages 18 and younger) totalled 17.00% of the population compared to pensioners who number 20.76%. This compares with the Italian average of 18.06% (minors) and 19.94% (pensioners). The average age of a Roman resident is 43 compared to the Italian average of 42. In the five years between 2002 and 2007, the population of Rome grew by 6.54%, while Italy as a whole grew by 3.56%. The current birth rate of Rome is 9.10 births per 1,000 inhabitants compared to the Italian average of 9.45 births.

The urban area of Rome extends beyond the administrative city limits with a population of around 3.9 million. Between 3.2 and 4.2 million people live in the Rome metropolitan area.

Origin groups

According to the latest statistics conducted by ISTAT, approximately 9.5% of the population consists of non-Italians. About half of the immigrant population consists of those of various other European origins (chiefly Romanian, Polish, Ukrainian, and Albanian) numbering a combined total of 131,118 or 4.7% of the population. The remaining 4.8% are those with non-European origins, chiefly Filipinos (26,933), Bangladeshis (12,154), and Chinese (10,283).

The Esquilino rione, off Termini Railway Station, has evolved into a largely immigrant neighbourhood. It is perceived as Rome's Chinatown. Immigrants from more than a hundred different countries reside there. A commercial district, Esquilino contains restaurants featuring many kinds of international cuisine. There are wholesale clothes shops. Of the 1,300 or so commercial premises operating in the district 800 are Chinese-owned; around 300 are run by immigrants from other countries around the world; 200 are owned by Italians.

Notable people

Religion

Much like the rest of Italy, Rome is predominantly Christian, and the city has been an important centre of religion and pilgrimage for centuries, the base of the ancient Roman religion with the pontifex maximus and later the seat of the Vatican and the pope. Before the arrival of the Christians in Rome, the Religio Romana (literally, the "Roman Religion") was the major religion of the city in classical antiquity. The first gods held sacred by the Romans were Jupiter, the Most High, and Mars, the god of war, and father of Rome's twin founders, Romulus and Remus, according to tradition. Other deities such as Vesta and Minerva were honoured. Rome was also the base of several mystery cults, such as Mithraism. Later, after St Peter and St Paul were martyred in the city, and the first Christians began to arrive, Rome became Christian, and the Old St. Peter's Basilica was constructed in 313 AD. Despite some interruptions (such as the Avignon papacy), Rome has for centuries been the home of the Roman Catholic Church and the Bishop of Rome, otherwise known as the Pope.

Despite the fact that Rome is home to the Vatican City and St. Peter's Basilica, Rome's cathedral is the Archbasilica of Saint John Lateran, in the south-east of the city centre. There are around 900 churches in Rome in total. Aside from the cathedral itself, some others of note include the Basilica di Santa Maria Maggiore, the Basilica of Saint Paul Outside the Walls, the Basilica di San Clemente, San Carlo alle Quattro Fontane and the Church of the Gesù. There are also the ancient Catacombs of Rome underneath the city. Numerous highly important religious educational institutions are also in Rome, such as the Pontifical Lateran University, Pontifical Biblical Institute, Pontifical Gregorian University, and Pontifical Oriental Institute.

Since the end of the Roman Republic, Rome is also the centre of an important Jewish community, which was once based in Trastevere, and later in the Roman Ghetto. There lies also the major synagogue in Rome, the Tempio Maggiore.

Vatican City

The territory of Vatican City is part of the Mons Vaticanus (Vatican Hill), and of the adjacent former Vatican Fields, where St. Peter's Basilica, the Apostolic Palace, the Sistine Chapel, and museums were built, along with various other buildings. The area was part of the Roman rione of Borgo until 1929. Being separated from the city on the west bank of the Tiber, the area was a suburb that was protected by being included within the walls of Leo IV, later expanded by the current fortification walls of Paul III, Pius IV, and Urban VIII.

When the Lateran Treaty of 1929 that created the Vatican state was being prepared, the boundaries of the proposed territory were influenced by the fact that much of it was all but enclosed by this loop. For some parts of the border, there was no wall, but the line of certain buildings supplied part of the boundary, and for a small part a new wall was constructed.

The territory includes Saint Peter's Square, separated from the territory of Italy only by a white line along with the limit of the square, where it borders Piazza Pio XII. St. Peter's Square is reached through the Via della Conciliazione, which runs from the Tiber to St. Peter's. This grand approach was designed by architects Piacentini and Spaccarelli, on the instructions of Benito Mussolini and in accordance with the church, after the conclusion of the Lateran Treaty. According to the Treaty, certain properties of the Holy See located in Italian territory, most notably the Papal Palace of Castel Gandolfo and the major basilicas, enjoy extraterritorial status similar to that of foreign embassies.

Pilgrimage

Rome has been a major Christian pilgrimage site since the Middle Ages. People from all over the Christian world visit Vatican City, within the city of Rome, the seat of the papacy. The city became a major pilgrimage site during the Middle Ages. Apart from brief periods as an independent city during the Middle Ages, Rome kept its status as Papal capital and holy city for centuries, even when the Papacy briefly relocated to Avignon (1309–1377). Catholics believe that the Vatican is the last resting place of St. Peter.

Pilgrimages to Rome can involve visits to many sites, both within Vatican City and in Italian territory. A popular stopping point is the Pilate's stairs: these are, according to the Christian tradition, the steps that led up to the praetorium of Pontius Pilate in Jerusalem, which Jesus Christ stood on during his Passion on his way to trial. The stairs were, reputedly, brought to Rome by Helena of Constantinople in the fourth century. For centuries, the Scala Santa has attracted Christian pilgrims who wished to honour the Passion of Jesus. Other objects of pilgrimage include several catacombs built in imperial times, in which Christians prayed, buried their dead and performed worship during periods of persecution, and various national churches (among them San Luigi dei francesi and Santa Maria dell'Anima), or churches associated with individual religious orders, such as the Jesuit Churches of Jesus and Sant'Ignazio.

Traditionally, pilgrims in Rome (as well as devout Romans) visit the seven pilgrim churches in 24 hours. This custom, mandatory for each pilgrim in the Middle Ages, was codified in the 16th century by Saint Philip Neri. The seven churches are the four major basilicas (St Peter in the Vatican, St Paul outside the Walls, St John in Lateran and Santa Maria Maggiore), while the other three are San Lorenzo fuori le mura (an Early Christian basilica), Santa Croce in Gerusalemme (a church founded by Helena, the mother of Constantine, which hosts fragments of wood attributed to the holy cross) and San Sebastiano fuori le mura (which lies on the Appian Way and is built above the Catacombs of San Sebastiano).

Cityscape

Architecture

Rome's architecture over the centuries has greatly developed, especially from the Classical and Imperial Roman styles to modern fascist architecture. Rome was for a period one of the world's main epicentres of classical architecture, developing new forms such as the arch, the dome and the vault. The Romanesque style in the 11th, 12th, and 13th centuries was also widely used in Roman architecture, and later the city became one of the main centres of Renaissance, Baroque and neoclassical architecture.

Ancient Rome

One of the symbols of Rome is the Colosseum (70–80 AD), the largest amphitheatre ever built in the Roman Empire. Originally capable of seating 60,000 spectators, it was used for gladiatorial combat. Important monuments and sites of ancient Rome include the Roman Forum, the Domus Aurea, the Pantheon, Trajan's Column, Trajan's Market, the Catacombs, the Circus Maximus, the Baths of Caracalla, Castel Sant'Angelo, the Mausoleum of Augustus, the Ara Pacis, the Arch of Constantine, the Pyramid of Cestius, and the Bocca della Verità.

Medieval
The medieval popular quarters of the city, situated mainly around the Capitol, were largely demolished between the end of the 19th century and the fascist period, but many notable buildings still remain. Basilicas dating from Christian antiquity include Saint Mary Major and Saint Paul outside the Walls (the latter largely rebuilt in the 19th century), both housing precious fourth century AD mosaics. Notable later medieval mosaics and frescoes can be also found in the churches of Santa Maria in Trastevere, Santi Quattro Coronati, and Santa Prassede. Secular buildings include a number of towers, the largest being the Torre delle Milizie and the Torre dei Conti, both next to the Roman Forum, and the huge outdoor stairway leading up to the basilica of Santa Maria in Aracoeli.

Renaissance and Baroque
Rome was a major world centre of the Renaissance, second only to Florence, and was profoundly affected by the movement. Among others, a masterpiece of Renaissance architecture in Rome is the Piazza del Campidoglio by Michelangelo. During this period, the great aristocratic families of Rome used to build opulent dwellings as the Palazzo del Quirinale (now seat of the President of the Italian Republic), the Palazzo Venezia, the Palazzo Farnese, the Palazzo Barberini, the Palazzo Chigi (now seat of the Italian Prime Minister), the Palazzo Spada, the Palazzo della Cancelleria, and the Villa Farnesina.

Many of the famous city's squares – some huge, majestic and often adorned with obelisks, some small and picturesque – took their present shape during the Renaissance and Baroque periods. The principal ones are Piazza Navona, the Spanish Steps, Campo de' Fiori, Piazza Venezia, Piazza Farnese, Piazza della Rotonda and Piazza della Minerva. One of the most emblematic examples of Baroque art is the Trevi Fountain by Nicola Salvi. Other notable 17th-century Baroque palaces are the Palazzo Madama, now the seat of the Italian Senate, and the Palazzo Montecitorio, now the seat of the Chamber of Deputies of Italy.

Neoclassicism

In 1870, Rome became the capital city of the new Kingdom of Italy. During this time, neoclassicism, a building style influenced by the architecture of antiquity, became the predominant influence in Roman architecture. During this period, many great palaces in neoclassical styles were built to host ministries, embassies, and other government agencies. One of the best-known symbols of Roman neoclassicism is the Monument to Vittorio Emanuele II or "Altar of the Fatherland", where the Grave of the Unknown Soldier, who represents the 650,000 Italian soldiers who died in World War I, is located.

Fascist architecture

The Fascist regime that ruled in Italy between 1922 and 1943 had its showcase in Rome. Mussolini ordered the construction of new roads and piazzas, resulting in the destruction of older roads, houses, churches and palaces erected during papal rule. The main activities during his government were: the "isolation" of the Capitoline Hill; Via dei Monti, later renamed Via del'Impero, and finally Via dei Fori Imperiali; Via del Mare, later renamed Via del Teatro di Marcello; the "isolation" of the Mausoleum of Augustus, with the erection of Piazza Augusto Imperatore; and Via della Conciliazione.

Architecturally, Italian Fascism favoured the most modern movements, such as Rationalism. Parallel to this, in the 1920s another style emerged, named "Stile Novecento", characterised by its links with ancient Roman architecture. Two important complexes in the latter style are the Foro Mussolini, now Foro Italico, by Enrico Del Debbio, and the Città universitaria ("University city"), by Marcello Piacentini, also author of the controversial destruction of part of the Borgo rione to open Via della Conciliazione.

The most important Fascist site in Rome is the EUR district, designed in 1938 by Piacentini. This new quarter emerged as a compromise between Rationalist and Novecento architects, the former being led by Giuseppe Pagano. The EUR was originally conceived for the 1942 world exhibition, and was called "E.42" ("Esposizione 42"). The most representative buildings of EUR are the Palazzo della Civiltà Italiana (1938–1943), and the Palazzo dei Congressi, examples of the Rationalist style. The world exhibition never took place, because Italy entered the Second World War in 1940, and the buildings were partly destroyed in 1943 in fighting between the Italian and German armies and later abandoned. The quarter was restored in the 1950s when the Roman authorities found that they already had the seed of an off-centre business district of the type that other capitals were still planning (London Docklands and La Défense in Paris). Also, the Palazzo della Farnesina, the current seat of the Italian Ministry of Foreign Affairs, was designed in 1935 in pure Fascist style.

Parks and gardens

Public parks and nature reserves cover a large area in Rome, and the city has one of the largest areas of green space among European capitals. The most notable part of this green space is represented by the large number of villas and landscaped gardens created by the Italian aristocracy. While most of the parks surrounding the villas were destroyed during the building boom of the late 19th century, some of them remain. The most notable of these are the Villa Borghese, Villa Ada, and Villa Doria Pamphili. The Villa Sciarra is on the hill, with playgrounds for children and shaded walking areas. In the nearby area of Trastevere, the Orto Botanico (Botanical Garden) is a cool and shady green space. The old Roman hippodrome (Circus Maximus) is another large green space: it has few trees but is overlooked by the Palatine and the Rose Garden ('roseto comunale'). Nearby is the lush Villa Celimontana, close to the gardens surrounding the Baths of Caracalla. The Villa Borghese garden is the best known large green space in Rome, with famous art galleries among its shaded walks. Overlooking Piazza del Popolo and the Spanish Steps are the gardens of Pincio and Villa Medici. There is also a notable pine wood at Castelfusano, near Ostia. Rome also has a number of regional parks of much more recent origin, including the Pineto Regional Park and the Appian Way Regional Park. There are also nature reserves at Marcigliana and at Tenuta di Castelporziano.

Fountains and aqueducts

Rome is a city known for its numerous fountains, built-in all different styles, from Classical and Medieval, to Baroque and Neoclassical. The city has had fountains for more than two thousand years, and they have provided drinking water and decorated the piazzas of Rome. During the Roman Empire, in 98 AD, according to Sextus Julius Frontinus, the Roman consul who was named curator aquarum or guardian of the water of the city, Rome had nine aqueducts which fed 39 monumental fountains and 591 public basins, not counting the water supplied to the Imperial household, baths, and owners of private villas. Each of the major fountains was connected to two different aqueducts, in case one was shut down for service.

During the 17th and 18th century, the Roman popes reconstructed other degraded Roman aqueducts and built new display fountains to mark their termini, launching the golden age of the Roman fountain. The fountains of Rome, like the paintings of Rubens, were expressions of the new style of Baroque art. In these fountains, sculpture became the principal element, and the water was used simply to animate and decorate the sculptures. They, like baroque gardens, were "a visual representation of confidence and power".

Statues

Rome is well known for its statues but, in particular, the talking statues of Rome. These are usually ancient statues which have become popular soapboxes for political and social discussion, and places for people to (often satirically) voice their opinions. There are two main talking statues: the Pasquino and the Marforio, yet there are four other noted ones: il Babuino, Madama Lucrezia, il Facchino and Abbot Luigi. Most of these statues are ancient Roman or classical, and most of them also depict mythical gods, ancient people or legendary figures; il Pasquino represents Menelaus, Abbot Luigi is an unknown Roman magistrate, il Babuino is supposed to be Silenus, Marforio represents Oceanus, Madama Lucrezia is a bust of Isis, and il Facchino is the only non-Roman statue, created in 1580, and not representing anyone in particular. They are often, due to their status, covered with placards or graffiti expressing political ideas and points of view. Other statues in the city, which are not related to the talking statues, include those of the Ponte Sant'Angelo, or several monuments scattered across the city, such as that to Giordano Bruno in the Campo de'Fiori.

Obelisks and columns

The city hosts eight ancient Egyptian and five ancient Roman obelisks, together with a number of more modern obelisks; there was also formerly (until 2005) an ancient Ethiopian obelisk in Rome. The city contains some of obelisks in piazzas, such as in Piazza Navona, St Peter's Square, Piazza Montecitorio, and Piazza del Popolo, and others in villas, thermae parks and gardens, such as in Villa Celimontana, the Baths of Diocletian, and the Pincian Hill. Moreover, the centre of Rome hosts also Trajan's and Antonine Column, two ancient Roman columns with spiral relief. The Column of Marcus Aurelius is located in Piazza Colonna and it was built around 180 AD by Commodus in memory of his parents. The Column of Marcus Aurelius was inspired by Trajan's Column at Trajan's Forum, which is part of the Imperial Fora.

Bridges

The city of Rome contains numerous famous bridges which cross the Tiber. The only bridge to remain unaltered until today from the classical age is Ponte dei Quattro Capi, which connects the Isola Tiberina with the left bank. The other surviving – albeit modified – ancient Roman bridges crossing the Tiber are Ponte Cestio, Ponte Sant'Angelo and Ponte Milvio. Considering Ponte Nomentano, also built during ancient Rome, which crosses the Aniene, currently there are five ancient Roman bridges still remaining in the city. Other noteworthy bridges are Ponte Sisto, the first bridge built in the Renaissance above Roman foundations; Ponte Rotto, actually the only remaining arch of the ancient Pons Aemilius, collapsed during the flood of 1598 and demolished at the end of the 19th century; and Ponte Vittorio Emanuele II, a modern bridge connecting Corso Vittorio Emanuele and Borgo. Most of the city's public bridges were built in Classical or Renaissance style, but also in Baroque, Neoclassical and Modern styles. According to the Encyclopædia Britannica, the finest ancient bridge remaining in Rome is the Ponte Sant'Angelo, which was completed in 135 AD, and was decorated with ten statues of the angels, designed by Bernini in 1688.

Catacombs

Rome has an extensive amount of ancient catacombs, or underground burial places under or near the city, of which there are at least forty, some discovered only in recent decades. Though most famous for Christian burials, they include pagan and Jewish burials, either in separate catacombs or mixed together. The first large-scale catacombs were excavated from the 2nd century onwards. Originally they were carved through tuff, a soft volcanic rock, outside the boundaries of the city, because Roman law forbade burial places within city limits. Currently, maintenance of the catacombs is in the hands of the Papacy which has invested in the Salesians of Don Bosco the supervision of the Catacombs of St. Callixtus on the outskirts of Rome.

Economy

As the capital of Italy, Rome hosts all the principal institutions of the nation, including the Presidency of the Republic, the government (and its single ), the Parliament, the main judicial Courts, and the diplomatic representatives of all the countries for the states of Italy and Vatican City. Many international institutions are located in Rome, notably cultural and scientific ones, such as the American Institute, the British School, the French Academy, the Scandinavian Institutes, and the German Archaeological Institute. There are also specialised agencies of the United Nations, such as the Food and Agriculture Organization (FAO). Rome also hosts major international and worldwide political and cultural organisations, such as the International Fund for Agricultural Development (IFAD), World Food Programme (WFP), the NATO Defence College, and the International Centre for the Study of the Preservation and Restoration of Cultural Property (ICCROM).

According to the GaWC study of world cities, Rome is a "Beta +" city. The city was ranked in 2014 as 32nd in the Global Cities Index, the highest in Italy. With a 2005 GDP of €94.376 billion (US$121.5 billion), the city produces 6.7% of the national GDP (more than any other single city in Italy), and its unemployment rate, lowered from 11.1% to 6.5% between 2001 and 2005, is now one of the lowest rates of all the European Union capital cities. Rome's economy grows at around 4.4% annually and continues to grow at a higher rate in comparison to any other city in the rest of the country. This means that were Rome a country, it would be the world's 52nd richest country by GDP, near to the size to that of Egypt. Rome also had a 2003 GDP per capita of €29,153 (US$37,412), which was second in Italy (after Milan), and is more than 134.1% of the EU average GDP per capita. Rome, on the whole, has the highest total earnings in Italy, reaching €47,076,890,463 in 2008, yet, in terms of average workers' incomes, the city places itself 9th in Italy, with €24,509. On a global level, Rome's workers receive the 30th highest wages in 2009, coming three places higher than in 2008, in which the city ranked 33rd. The Rome area had a GDP amounting to $167.8 billion, and $38,765 per capita.

Although the economy of Rome is characterised by the absence of heavy industry, and it is largely dominated by services, high-technology companies (IT, aerospace, defence, telecommunications), research, construction and commercial activities (especially banking), and the huge development of tourism are very dynamic and extremely important to its economy. Rome's international airport, Fiumicino, is the largest in Italy, and the city hosts the head offices of the vast majority of the major Italian companies, as well as the headquarters of three of the world's 100 largest companies: Enel, Eni, and Telecom Italia.

Universities, national radio and television and the movie industry in Rome are also important parts of the economy: Rome is also the hub of the Italian film industry, thanks to the Cinecittà studios, working since the 1930s. The city is also a centre for banking and insurance as well as electronics, energy, transport, and aerospace industries. Numerous international companies and agencies headquarters, government ministries, conference centres, sports venues, and museums are located in Rome's principal business districts: the Esposizione Universale Roma (EUR); the Torrino (further south from the EUR); the Magliana; the Parco de' Medici-Laurentina and the so-called Tiburtina-valley along the ancient Via Tiburtina.

Education

Rome is a nationwide and major international centre for higher education, containing numerous academies, colleges and universities. It boasts a large variety of academies and colleges, and has always been a major worldwide intellectual and educational centre, especially during Ancient Rome and the Renaissance, along with Florence. According to the City Brands Index, Rome is considered the world's second most historically, educationally and culturally interesting and beautiful city.

Rome has many universities and colleges. Its first university, La Sapienza (founded in 1303), is one of the largest in the world, with more than 140,000 students attending; in 2005 it ranked as Europe's 33rd best university and in 2013 the Sapienza University of Rome ranked as the 62nd in the world and the top in Italy in its World University Rankings. and has been ranked among Europe's 50 and the world's 150 best colleges. In order to decrease the overcrowding of La Sapienza, two new public universities were founded during the last decades: Tor Vergata in 1982, and Roma Tre in 1992. Rome hosts also the LUISS School of Government, Italy's most important graduate university in the areas of international affairs and European studies as well as LUISS Business School, Italy's most important business school. Rome ISIA was founded in 1973 by Giulio Carlo Argan and is Italy's oldest institution in the field of industrial design.

Rome contains many pontifical universities and other institutes, including the British School at Rome, the French School in Rome, the Pontifical Gregorian University (the oldest Jesuit university in the world, founded in 1551), Istituto Europeo di Design, the Scuola Lorenzo de' Medici, the Link Campus of Malta, and the Università Campus Bio-Medico. Rome is also the location of two American Universities; The American University of Rome and John Cabot University as well as St. John's University branch campus, John Felice Rome Center, a campus of Loyola University Chicago and Temple University Rome, a campus of Temple University. The Roman Colleges are several seminaries for students from foreign countries studying for the priesthood at the Pontifical Universities.
Examples include the Venerable English College, the Pontifical North American College, the Scots College, and the Pontifical Croatian College of St. Jerome.

Rome's major libraries include: the Biblioteca Angelica, opened in 1604, making it Italy's first public library; the Biblioteca Vallicelliana, established in 1565; the Biblioteca Casanatense, opened in 1701; the National Central Library, one of the two national libraries in Italy, which contains 4,126,002 volumes; The Biblioteca del Ministero degli Affari Esteri, specialised in diplomacy, foreign affairs and modern history; the Biblioteca dell'Istituto dell'Enciclopedia Italiana; the Biblioteca Don Bosco, one of the largest and most modern of all Salesian libraries; the Biblioteca e Museo teatrale del Burcardo, a museum-library specialised in history of drama and theatre; the Biblioteca della Società Geografica Italiana, which is based in the Villa Celimontana and is the most important geographical library in Italy, and one of Europe's most important; and the Vatican Library, one of the oldest and most important libraries in the world, which was formally established in 1475, though in fact much older and has 75,000 codices, as well as 1.1 million printed books, which include some 8,500 incunabula. There are also many specialist libraries attached to various foreign cultural institutes in Rome, among them that of the American Academy in Rome, the French Academy in Rome and the Bibliotheca Hertziana – Max Planck Institute of Art History, a German library, often noted for excellence in the arts and sciences.

Culture

Entertainment and performing arts

Rome is an important centre for music, and it has an intense musical scene, including several prestigious music conservatories and theatres. It hosts the Accademia Nazionale di Santa Cecilia (founded in 1585), for which new concert halls have been built in the new Parco della Musica, one of the largest musical venues in the world. Rome also has an opera house, the Teatro dell'Opera di Roma, as well as several minor musical institutions. The city also played host to the Eurovision Song Contest in 1991 and the MTV Europe Music Awards in 2004.

Rome has also had a major impact on music history. The Roman School was a group of composers of predominantly church music, which were active in the city during the 16th and 17th centuries, therefore spanning the late Renaissance and early Baroque eras. The term also refers to the music they produced. Many of the composers had a direct connection to the Vatican and the papal chapel, though they worked at several churches; stylistically they are often contrasted with the Venetian School of composers, a concurrent movement which was much more progressive. By far the most famous composer of the Roman School is Giovanni Pierluigi da Palestrina, whose name has been associated for four hundred years with smooth, clear, polyphonic perfection. However, there were other composers working in Rome, and in a variety of styles and forms.

Between 1960 and 1970 Rome was considered to be as a “new Hollywood” because of the many actors and directors who worked there; Via Vittorio Veneto had transformed into a glamour place where you could meet famous people.

Tourism

Rome today is one of the most important tourist destinations of the world, due to the incalculable immensity of its archaeological and artistic treasures, as well as for the charm of its unique traditions, the beauty of its panoramic views, and the majesty of its magnificent "villas" (parks). Among the most significant resources are the many museums – Musei Capitolini, the Vatican Museums and the Galleria Borghese and others dedicated to modern and contemporary art – aqueducts, fountains, churches, palaces, historical buildings, the monuments and ruins of the Roman Forum, and the Catacombs. Rome is the third most visited city in the EU, after London and Paris, and receives an average of 7–10 million tourists a year, which sometimes doubles on holy years. The Colosseum (4 million tourists) and the Vatican Museums (4.2 million tourists) are the 39th and 37th (respectively) most visited places in the world, according to a recent study.

Rome is a major archaeological hub, and one of the world's main centres of archaeological research. There are numerous cultural and research institutes located in the city, such as the American Academy in Rome, and The Swedish Institute at Rome. Rome contains numerous ancient sites, including the Forum Romanum, Trajan's Market, Trajan's Forum, the Colosseum, and the Pantheon, to name but a few. The Colosseum, arguably one of Rome's most iconic archaeological sites, is regarded as a wonder of the world.

Rome contains a vast and impressive collection of art, sculpture, fountains, mosaics, frescos, and paintings, from all different periods. Rome first became a major artistic centre during ancient Rome, with forms of important Roman art such as architecture, painting, sculpture and mosaic work. Metal-work, coin die and gem engraving, ivory carvings, figurine glass, pottery, and book illustrations are considered to be 'minor' forms of Roman artwork. Rome later became a major centre of Renaissance art, since the popes spent vast sums of money for the constructions of grandiose basilicas, palaces, piazzas and public buildings in general. Rome became one of Europe's major centres of Renaissance artwork, second only to Florence, and able to compare to other major cities and cultural centres, such as Paris and Venice. The city was affected greatly by the baroque, and Rome became the home of numerous artists and architects, such as Bernini, Caravaggio, Carracci, Borromini and Cortona. In the late 18th century and early 19th century, the city was one of the centres of the Grand Tour, when wealthy, young English and other European aristocrats visited the city to learn about ancient Roman culture, art, philosophy, and architecture. Rome hosted a great number of neoclassical and rococo artists, such as Pannini and Bernardo Bellotto. Today, the city is a major artistic centre, with numerous art institutes and museums.

Rome has a growing stock of contemporary and modern art and architecture. The National Gallery of Modern Art has works by Balla, Morandi, Pirandello, Carrà, De Chirico, De Pisis, Guttuso, Fontana, Burri, Mastroianni, Turcato, Kandisky, and Cézanne on permanent exhibition. 2010 saw the opening of Rome's newest arts foundation, a contemporary art and architecture gallery designed by acclaimed Iraqi architect Zaha Hadid. Known as MAXXI – National Museum of the 21st Century Arts it restores a dilapidated area with striking modern architecture. Maxxi features a campus dedicated to culture, experimental research laboratories, international exchange and study and research. It is one of Rome's most ambitious modern architecture projects alongside Renzo Piano's Auditorium Parco della Musica and Massimiliano Fuksas' Rome Convention Center, Centro Congressi Italia EUR, in the EUR district, due to open in 2016. The convention centre features a huge translucent container inside which is suspended a steel and teflon structure resembling a cloud and which contains meeting rooms and an auditorium with two piazzas open to the neighbourhood on either side.

Fashion

Rome is also widely recognised as a world fashion capital. Although not as important as Milan, Rome is the fourth most important centre for fashion in the world, according to the 2009 Global Language Monitor after Milan, New York, and Paris, and beating London.

Major luxury fashion houses and jewellery chains, such as Valentino, Bulgari, Fendi, Laura Biagiotti, Brioni, and Renato Balestra, are headquartered or were founded in the city. Also, other major labels, such as Gucci, Chanel, Prada, Dolce & Gabbana, Armani, and Versace have luxury boutiques in Rome, primarily along its prestigious and upscale Via dei Condotti.

Cuisine

Rome's cuisine has evolved through centuries and periods of social, cultural, and political changes. Rome became a major gastronomical centre during the ancient age. Ancient Roman cuisine was highly influenced by Ancient Greek culture, and after, the empire's enormous expansion exposed Romans to many new, provincial culinary habits and cooking techniques.

Later, during the Renaissance, Rome became well known as a centre of high-cuisine, since some of the best chefs of the time worked for the popes. An example of this was Bartolomeo Scappi, who was a chef working for Pius IV in the Vatican kitchen, and he acquired fame in 1570 when his cookbook Opera dell'arte del cucinare was published. In the book he lists approximately 1000 recipes of the Renaissance cuisine and describes cooking techniques and tools, giving the first known picture of a fork.

The Testaccio, Rome's trade and slaughterhouse area, was often known as the "belly" or "slaughterhouse" of Rome, and was inhabited by butchers, or vaccinari. The most common or ancient Roman cuisine included the "fifth quarter". The old-fashioned coda alla vaccinara (oxtail cooked in the way of butchers) is still one of the city's most popular meals and is part of most of Rome's restaurants' menus. Lamb is also a very popular part of Roman cuisine, and is often roasted with spices and herbs.

In the modern age, the city developed its own peculiar cuisine, based on products of the nearby Campagna, as lamb and vegetables (globe artichokes are common). In parallel, Roman Jews – present in the city since the 1st century BC – developed their own cuisine, the cucina giudaico-romanesca.

Examples of Roman dishes include saltimbocca alla romana – a veal cutlet, Roman-style, topped with raw ham and sage and simmered with white wine and butter; carciofi alla romana – artichokes Roman-style, outer leaves removed, stuffed with mint, garlic, breadcrumbs and braised; carciofi alla giudia – artichokes fried in olive oil, typical of Roman Jewish cooking, outer leaves removed, stuffed with mint, garlic, breadcrumbs and braised; spaghetti alla carbonara – spaghetti with bacon, eggs and pecorino; and gnocchi di semolino alla romana – semolina dumpling, Roman-style.

Cinema

Rome hosts the Cinecittà Studios, the largest film and television production facility in continental Europe and the centre of the Italian cinema, where many of today's biggest box office hits are filmed. More than 3,000 productions have been made on its lot, from recent features like The Passion of the Christ, Gangs of New York, HBO's Rome, The Life Aquatic and Dino De Laurentiis' Decameron, to such cinema classics as Ben-Hur, Cleopatra, and the films of Federico Fellini.

Founded in 1937 by Benito Mussolini, the studios were bombed by the Western Allies during the Second World War. In the 1950s, Cinecittà was the filming location for several large American film productions, and subsequently became the studio most closely associated with Federico Fellini. Today, Cinecittà is the only studio in the world with pre-production, production, and full post-production facilities on one lot, allowing directors and producers to walk in with their script and "walkout" with a completed film.

Language

Although associated today only with Latin, ancient Rome was in fact multilingual. In the highest antiquity, Sabine tribes shared the area of what is today Rome with Latin tribes. The Sabine language was one of the Italic group of ancient Italian languages, along with Etruscan, which would have been the main language of the last three kings who ruled the city till the founding of the Republic in 509 BC. Urganilla, or Plautia Urgulanilla, wife of Emperor Claudius, is thought to have been a speaker of Etruscan many centuries after this date, according to Suetonius' entry on Claudius. However Latin, in various evolving forms, was the main language of classical Rome, but as the city had immigrants, slaves, residents, ambassadors from many parts of the world it was also multilingual. Many educated Romans also spoke Greek, and there was a large Greek, Syriac and Jewish population in parts of Rome from well before the Empire.

Latin evolved during the Middle Ages into a new language, the "volgare". The latter emerged as the confluence of various regional dialects, among which the Tuscan dialect predominated, but the population of Rome also developed its own dialect, the Romanesco. The Romanesco spoken during the Middle Ages was more like a southern Italian dialect, very close to the Neapolitan language in Campania. The influence of the Florentine culture during the renaissance, and above all, the immigration to Rome of many Florentines following the two Medici Popes (Leo X and Clement VII), caused a major shift in the dialect, which began to resemble more the Tuscan varieties. This remained largely confined to Rome until the 19th century, but then expanded to other zones of Lazio (Civitavecchia, Latina and others), from the beginning of the 20th century, thanks to the rising population of Rome and to improving transportation systems. As a consequence of education and media like radio and television, Romanesco became more similar to standard Italian but does not represent standard Italian. Dialectal literature in the traditional form of Romanesco includes the works of such authors as Giuseppe Gioachino Belli, Trilussa and Cesare Pascarella. It is worth remembering though that Romanesco was a "lingua vernacola" (vernacular language), meaning that for centuries, it did not have a written form but it was only spoken by the population.

Contemporary Romanesco is mainly represented by popular actors and actresses, such as Alberto Sordi, Aldo Fabrizi, Anna Magnani, Carlo Verdone, Enrico Montesano, Gigi Proietti and Nino Manfredi.

Rome's historic contribution to language in a worldwide sense is much more extensive, however. Through the process of Romanization, the peoples of Italy, Gallia, the Iberian Peninsula and Dacia developed languages which derive directly from Latin and were adopted in large areas of the world, all through cultural influence, colonisation and migration. Moreover, also modern English, because of the Norman Conquest, borrowed a large percentage of its vocabulary from the Latin language. The Roman or Latin alphabet is the most widely used writing system in the world used by the greatest number of languages.

Rome has long hosted artistic communities, foreign resident communities and many foreign religious students or pilgrims and so has always been a multilingual city. Today because of mass tourism, many languages are used in servicing tourism, especially English which is widely known in tourist areas, and the city hosts large numbers of immigrants and so has many multilingual immigrant areas.

Sports

Association football is the most popular sport in Rome, as in the rest of the country.
The city hosted the final games of the 1934 and 1990 FIFA World Cup.
The latter took place in the Stadio Olimpico, which is also the shared home stadium for local Serie A clubs S.S. Lazio, founded in 1900, and A.S. Roma, founded in 1927, whose rivalry in the Derby della Capitale has become a staple of Roman sports culture.
Footballers who play for these teams and are also born in the city tend to become especially popular, as has been the case with players such as Francesco Totti and Daniele De Rossi (both for A.S. Roma), and Alessandro Nesta (for S.S. Lazio).

Rome hosted the 1960 Summer Olympics, with great success, using many ancient sites such as the Villa Borghese and the Thermae of Caracalla as venues. For the Olympic Games many new facilities were built, notably the new large Olympic Stadium (which was then enlarged and renewed to host several matches and the final of the 1990 FIFA World Cup), the Stadio Flaminio, the Villaggio Olimpico (Olympic Village, created to host the athletes and redeveloped after the games as a residential district), ecc. Rome made a bid to host the 2020 Summer Olympics but it was withdrawn before the deadline for applicant files.

Further, Rome hosted the 1991 EuroBasket and is home to the internationally recognised basketball team Virtus Roma. Rugby union is gaining wider acceptance. Until 2011 the Stadio Flaminio was the home stadium for the Italy national rugby union team, which has been playing in the Six Nations Championship since 2000. The team now plays home games at the Stadio Olimpico because the Stadio Flaminio needs works of renovation in order to improve both its capacity and safety. Rome is home to local rugby union teams such as Rugby Roma (founded in 1930 and winner of five Italian championships, the latter in 1999–2000), Unione Rugby Capitolina and S.S. Lazio 1927 (rugby union branch of the multisport club S.S. Lazio).

Every May, Rome hosts the ATP Masters Series tennis tournament on the clay courts of the Foro Italico. Cycling was popular in the post-World War II period, although its popularity has faded. Rome has hosted the final portion of the Giro d'Italia three times, in 1911, 1950, and 2009. Rome is also home to other sports teams, including volleyball (M. Roma Volley), handball or waterpolo.

Transport

Rome is at the centre of the radial network of roads that roughly follow the lines of the ancient Roman roads which began at the Capitoline Hill and connected Rome with its empire.

Due to its location in the centre of the Italian peninsula, Rome is the principal railway node for central Italy. Rome's main railway station, Termini, is one of the largest railway stations in Europe and the most heavily used in Italy, with around 400 thousand travellers passing through every day. The second-largest station in the city, Roma Tiburtina, has been redeveloped as a high-speed rail terminus. As well as frequent high-speed day trains to all major Italian cities, Rome is linked nightly by 'boat train' sleeper services to Sicily, and internationally by overnight sleeper services to Munich and Vienna by ÖBB Austrian railways.

Rome is served by three airports. The intercontinental Leonardo da Vinci International Airport, Italy's chief airport is located within the nearby Fiumicino, south-west of Rome. The older Rome Ciampino Airport is a joint civilian and military airport. It is commonly referred to as "Ciampino Airport", as it is located beside Ciampino, south-east of Rome. The main airport system of the city (composed of Fiumicino and Ciampino), with 32.8 million passengers transported in 2022, is the second airport system in Italy after that of Milan with 42.2 million.

Although the city has its own quarter on the Mediterranean Sea (Lido di Ostia), this has only a marina and a small channel-harbour for fishing boats.

The city suffers from traffic problems largely due to this radial street pattern, making it difficult for Romans to move easily from the vicinity of one of the radial roads to another without going into the historic centre or using the ring-road. These problems are not helped by the limited size of Rome's metro system when compared to other cities of similar size. In addition, Rome has only 21 taxis for every 10,000 inhabitants, far below other major European cities. Chronic congestion caused by cars during the 1970s and 1980s led to restrictions being placed on vehicle access to the inner city-centre during the hours of daylight. Areas, where these restrictions apply, are known as Limited Traffic Zones (Zona a Traffico Limitato (ZTL) in Italian). More recently, heavy night-time traffic in Trastevere, Testaccio and San Lorenzo has led to the creation of night-time ZTLs in those districts.

A 3-line metro system called the Metropolitana operates in Rome. Construction on the first branch started in the 1930s. The line had been planned to quickly connect the main railway station with the newly planned E42 area in the southern suburbs, where 1942 the World Fair was supposed to be held. The event never took place because of war, but the area was later partly redesigned and renamed EUR (Esposizione Universale di Roma: Rome Universal Exhibition) in the 1950s to serve as a modern business district. The line was finally opened in 1955, and it is now the south part of the B Line.

The A line opened in 1980 from Ottaviano to Anagnina stations, later extended in stages (1999–2000) to Battistini. In the 1990s, an extension of the B line was opened from Termini to Rebibbia. This underground network is generally reliable (although it may become very congested at peak times and during events, especially the A line) as it is relatively short.

The A and B lines intersect at Roma Termini station. A new branch of the B line (B1) opened on 13 June 2012 after an estimated building cost of €500 million.

It will partly replace the existing Termini-Pantano rail line. It will feature full automated, driverless trains. The first section with 15 stations connecting Pantano with the quarter of Centocelle in the eastern part of the city, opened on 9 November 2014. The end of the work was scheduled in 2015, but archaeological findings often delay underground construction work.

A fourth line, D line, is also planned. The first section was projected to open in 2015 and the final sections before 2035, but due to the city's financial crisis, the project has been put on hold.

Above-ground public transport in Rome is made up of a bus, tram and urban train network (FR lines). The bus, tram, metro and urban railways network is run by Atac S.p.A. (which originally stood for the Municipal Bus and Tramways Company, Azienda Tramvie e Autobus del Comune in Italian). The bus network has in excess of 350 bus lines and over eight thousand bus stops, whereas the more-limited tram system has  of track and 192 stops. There is also one trolleybus line, opened in 2005, and 
additional two lines were opened.

International entities, organisations and involvement

Among the global cities, Rome is unique in having two sovereign entities located entirely within its city limits, the Holy See, represented by the Vatican City State, and the territorially smaller Sovereign Military Order of Malta. The Vatican is an enclave of the Italian capital city and a sovereign possession of the Holy See, which is the Diocese of Rome and the supreme government of the Roman Catholic Church. For this reason, Rome has sometimes been described as the capital of two states. Rome, therefore, hosts foreign embassies to the Italian government, to the Holy See, to the Order of Malta and to certain international organisations. Several international Roman Colleges and Pontifical Universities are located in Rome.

The Pope is the Bishop of Rome and its official seat is the Archbasilica of Saint John Lateran (of which the President of the French Republic is ex officio the "first and only honorary canon", a title held by the heads of the French state since King Henry IV of France). Another body, the Sovereign Military Order of Malta (SMOM), took refuge in Rome in 1834, due to the conquest of Malta by Napoleon in 1798. It is sometimes classified as having sovereignty but does not claim any territory in Rome or anywhere else, hence leading to dispute over its actual sovereign status.

Rome is the seat of the so-called "Polo Romano" made up by three main international agencies of the United Nations: the Food and Agriculture Organization (FAO), the World Food Programme (WFP) and the International Fund for Agricultural Development (IFAD).

Rome has traditionally been involved in the process of European political integration. The Treaties of the EU are located in Palazzo della Farnesina, the seat of the Ministry of Foreign Affairs, because the Italian government is the depositary of the treaties. In 1957 the city hosted the signing of the Treaty of Rome, which established the European Economic Community (predecessor to the European Union), and also played host to the official signing of the proposed European Constitution in July 2004.

Rome is the seat of the European Olympic Committee and of the NATO Defense College. The city is the place where the Statute of the International Criminal Court and the European Convention on Human Rights were formulated.

The city hosts also other important international entities such as the IDLO (International Development Law Organisation), the ICCROM (International Centre for the Study of the Preservation and Restoration of Cultural Property) and the UNIDROIT (International Institute for the Unification of Private Law).

International relations

Twin towns and sister cities

Since 9 April 1956, Rome is exclusively and reciprocally twinned only with:
  Paris, France, 1956
 Solo Parigi è degna di Roma; solo Roma è degna di Parigi. 
 Seule Paris est digne de Rome; seule Rome est digne de Paris. 
 "Only Paris is worthy of Rome; only Rome is worthy of Paris."

Other relationships

Rome's other partner cities are:

See also

 Outline of Rome
 SPQR
 Tourism in Italy

Notes

References

Bibliography

External links

 Comune of Rome 
  APT (official Tourist Office) of the City of Rome 
 Rome Museums – official site.  .
 Capitoline Museums 
 

 
 
Capitals in Europe
.
Catholic pilgrimage sites
Holy cities
Places in the deuterocanonical books
New Testament cities
Populated places established in the 8th century BC
8th-century BC establishments in Italy
World Heritage Sites in Italy